Franz-Josef 'Jupp' Tenhagen (born 31 October 1952 in Millingen) is a retired German football player and a football coach.

Career
The defensive footballer played 457 games and scored 25 goals in the Bundesliga.

Tenhagen won three caps for West Germany in 1977.

Career statistics

Honours
 DFB-Pokal: runner-up 1987–88

References

External links
 
 
 

1952 births
Living people
People from Rees, Germany
Sportspeople from Düsseldorf (region)
German footballers
Germany international footballers
Germany B international footballers
German football managers
Rot-Weiß Oberhausen players
VfL Bochum players
Borussia Dortmund players
Bundesliga players
VfL Bochum managers
Bundesliga managers
Rot Weiss Ahlen managers
1. FC Bocholt managers
SC Fortuna Köln managers
SG Wattenscheid 09 managers
Association football defenders
Association football midfielders
Footballers from North Rhine-Westphalia